Fossil Record is a biannual peer-reviewed scientific journal covering palaeontology. It was established in 1998 as the Mitteilungen aus dem Museum für Naturkunde in Berlin, Geowissenschaftliche Reihe and originally published on behalf of the Museum für Naturkunde by Wiley-VCH. On 1 January, 2022, Fossil Record changed publisher to Pensoft Publishers, the editor-in-chief is Florian Witzmann.

Abstracting and indexing 

The journal is abstracted and indexed in the Science Citation Index Expanded, BIOSIS Previews, The Zoological Record, and Scopus. According to the Journal Citation Reports, the journal has a 2020 impact factor of 2.081.

References

External links 
 

Paleontology journals
Publications established in 1998
Creative Commons Attribution-licensed journals
English-language journals
Biannual journals
Academic journals published by museums

Pensoft Publishers academic journals